The Wild Blue Yonder (also known as The Wild Blue Yonder, The Story of the B-29 Superfortress) is a 1951 war film directed by Allan Dwan. (The film was re-released in 1958.) The film stars Wendell Corey, Vera Ralston, Forrest Tucker and Phil Harris.  Wild Blue Yonder deals with the Boeing B-29 Superfortress air raids on Japan during World War II.

Plot
In 1943, Capt. Harold "Cal" Calvert (Wendell Corey) is sent on a course at Smoky Hill, Kansas, to learn to fly a new bomber, the Boeing B-29 Superfortress. His instructor is his cousin, Major Tom West (Forrest Tucker), an officer who the other pilots think has shirked his duties by claiming engine trouble on the raid over the Ploesti oil fields. Cal stands up for Tom when a crewman taunts his cousin in front of Helen (Vera Ralston), a nurse that Tom has been seeing.

Cal and the other students learn that the pressurized B-29 can fly higher, faster and farther than any other bomber. On a test flight, when an overconfident Cal pushes a B-29 higher than instructed, a sudden decompression nearly ends in tragedy. One of the crew is sucked out of the aircraft, but is able to use his parachute. Tom is furious and reprimands Cal for endangering the test program, which the Air Force brass is monitoring closely.

Maj. Gen. Wolfe (Walter Brennan) finally declares that the pilots and the B-29s are ready for combat. He leads them to bases in China where they will launch attacks on Japan. Cal's first missions are harrowing, although the B-29s prove to be extremely effective. When the group is transferred to Guam, Tom is reunited with Helen, who is also assigned there. Cal is flying continually on high altitude missions, but Gen. Curtis E. LeMay (William Witney), the new commanding officer, changes tactics to more accurate low altitude raids that will produce more damage.

Helen is slowly falling for the more heroic Cal, and when he and Tom are on a mission together in a mass raid on Tokyo, their B-29 is hit by anti-aircraft fire. With Cal wounded and Tom at the controls, the stricken aircraft barely makes it back to the base. Tom goes back into the fiery wreckage to save a trapped crewman, but is killed when the aircraft explodes. Several weeks later, as the war ends when B-29s drop the most devastating weapon of all, the atom bomb, on cities in Japan, Cal and Helen remain together.

Cast

 Wendell Corey as  Capt. Harold "Cal" Calvert 
 Vera Ralston as Lt. Helen Landers 
 Forrest Tucker as Maj. Tom West 
 Phil Harris as Sgt. Hank Stack 
 Walter Brennan as Maj. Gen. Wolfe 
 William Ching as Lt. Ted Cranshaw 
 Ruth Donnelly as Maj. Ida Winton 
 Harry Carey Jr. as Sgt. Shaker Schuker 
 Penny Edwards as Connie Hudson
 Wally Cassell as Sgt. Pulaski 
 James Brown as Sgt. "Pop" Davis 
 Richard Erdman as  Cpl. Frenchy 
 Phillip Pine as Sgt. Tony 
 Martin Kilburn as "Peanuts" 
 Jay Silverheels as Benders
 Jack Kelly as Lt. Jessup 
 Hall Bartlett as Lt. Jorman 
 William Witney as Gen. Curtis E. LeMay

Production

The working title of the film was "Wings Across the Pacific". The production relied heavily on USAF and Marine Corps assistance. Location photography took place from April 3 to mid-May 1951 at March Field Air Base and Mojave Airport Marine Base in California, Davis-Monthan Field in Tucson, Arizona, and Walker Air Force Base in Roswell, New Mexico, where the 22nd Bomb Group's 2nd Squadron was flying B-29s operationally. The aerial scenes of the bombing of Tokyo were filmed above Santa Catalina Island.

Reception
The Wild Blue Yonder was well received by the public, but fared poorly with critics. At best, reviewer Alun Evans considered it a "tame tribute to the B-29 bomber ... routine heroics against the Japanese ..." Bosley Crowther of The New York Times wrote, "... this soggy saga of bomber airmen in World War II plows monotonously through every cliché of aerial war films before it hits the mud and then it bogs down in the bathos of mawkish heroics and tears."

On September 24, 1951, on a special Lux Radio Theatre broadcast honoring the 50th anniversary of motion pictures, the lead actors, Corey, Ralston and Tucker, recreated brief scenes from The Wild Blue Yonder.

References

Notes

Citations

Bibliography

 Evans, Alun. Brassey's Guide to War Films. Dulles, Virginia: Potomac Books, 2000. .
 Orriss, Bruce. When Hollywood Ruled the Skies: The Aviation Film Classics of World War II. Hawthorne, California: Aero Associates Inc., 1984. .

External links
 
 

1951 films
American aviation films
American black-and-white films
Boeing B-29 Superfortress
Films scored by Victor Young
Films directed by Allan Dwan
Republic Pictures films
Films about the United States Army Air Forces
World War II aviation films
American war films
1950s war films
1950s English-language films
1950s American films